Armeria duriaei is a flowering plant in the family Plumbaginaceae. It is endemic to mountains of north-western Spain and adjacent regions of Portugal. Its flowers are usually pink, or rarely white.

References

Sources
 The Plant List entry
 Alpine Garden Society entry
 JSTOR entry

duriaei
Taxa named by Pierre Edmond Boissier